Imperfect Harmonies is the second studio album by Armenian-American singer Serj Tankian. The album was released on September 21, 2010 through Reprise Records and Serjical Strike Records.

Release and promotion
Imperfect Harmonies was originally scheduled to be released on September 7, 2010, but was later pushed back two weeks to September 21. The paper manufacturing plant that Tankian selected to print the album's booklet ran out of tree-free paper and needed more time to obtain more of the material. Tankian is environmentally conscious and researched this type of paper on his own. Other releases by Tankian that use tree-free paper include his first solo effort Elect the Dead, and Hypnotize and Mezmerize, the last two releases by his band System of a Down.

The first song released off of Imperfect Harmonies was "Borders Are...". The song was released in June 2010 as a free download and also as an online lyric video. Serj Tankian had no involvement with the video. It was created by George Tonikian as a promotional tool while Tankian was on tour. This was followed by the album's first official single, "Left of Center". The song was released as a single in July 2010 and was later released as a music video in August 2010. These first two songs released from Imperfect Harmonies were described by Tankian as being "the most blatantly political songs on the record. Everything is a bit more philosophical and... more abstract.". Later he released "Disowned Inc." on his web page, and also created a game to discover pieces of the song.

The album opened at No. 35 on the Billboard 200 with 10,200 copies.

Musical direction
In 2009, Tankian collaborated with New Zealand's Auckland Philharmonia Orchestra to perform a symphonic version of Elect the Dead. This pairing resulted in the live album Elect the Dead Symphony released in 2010. The experimentation of mixing orchestra music with rock music inspired Tankian to explore this blend further. In addition to orchestral music, Imperfect Harmonies takes influences from jazz and electronica.

Touring
A world tour in support of the album began August 7 in Pori. Most shows featured the Flying Cunts of Chaos backed by eight classical players chosen from the city the performance took place in. The Lowlands Festival performance was a notable exception to this rule, where the band was backed by the Metropole Orchestra. As with previous tours, only material from Tankian's solo career was played. Beatus, Reconstructive Demonstrations and Wings of Summer were the only songs from the new album that were never performed.

On September 7 the Imperfect Harmonies tour was postponed until after the release of the album, although the tour never resumed.

Reception

The album divided critics, some of which praised Tankian's new direction, while others criticised it for being too much of a departure. Overall, the album received generally favourable reviews, although first week sales figures were notably lower than Elect the Dead.

Track listing

Personnel
All songs written, performed, produced, engineered and orchestrated by Serj Tankian.
Vincent Pedulla – additional orchestrations
Dan Monti – additional guitars on tracks 2, 6 & 11 and drum and bass engineering on tracks 1–6, 9 & 11
Troy Zeigler – live drumming on tracks 1–6, 9 & 11
Brain – live drumming on track 10
Mario Pagliarulo – live bass on tracks 1–6, 9 & 11
Shana Halligan – additional vocals on tracks 4 & 11
Ani Maldjian – additional operatic vocals on various songs
David Alpay – solo violin on track 11

Charts

References

2010 albums
Reprise Records albums
Serj Tankian albums
Albums produced by Serj Tankian
Serjical Strike Records albums